Mark Cutifani (born 2 May 1958) is an Australian businessman and the former chief executive of diversified mining group, Anglo American plc where he is also a member of the Board and Group Management Committee (GMC). Cutifani is a non-executive director of Anglo American Platinum, and chairman of De Beers. He is also a Non-Executive Director of Total S.A. He was formerly CEO of South African gold mining company AngloGold Ashanti. Cutifani is a fellow of the Royal Academy of Engineering, a board member of the Hydrogen Council., recipient of the AusIMM Institute Medal. and Mines and Money Lifetime Achievement Award winner.

Early life and education
Cutifani was born and grew up in Wollongong, Australia. After leaving high school in 1976, he joined Coal Cliff colliery and enrolled in the University of Wollongong to complete a degree in Mining Engineering. He graduated in 1982 at the top of his class. He was also the winner of numerous awards including the Atlas Copco Travelling Bursary for the top mining student in Australasia in 1982.

Career

Early career

After working for Coal Cliff, he joined Kalgoorlie Gold Mines, and later the Western Mining Corporation, Normandy Mining and Sons of Gwalia. He became the managing director of Sons of Gwalia in March 2000. In October 2006, Cutifani was appointed chief operating officer for Inco Limited and then Vale's global Nickel business, based in Canada.

AngloGold Ashanti

On 17 September 2007, he joined AngloGold Ashanti as a director of the company, and was appointed chief executive officer on 1 October that year.  Cutifani was credited with dismantling AngloGold Ashanti's significant and toxic hedge book, allowing the company to benefit fully from the much higher gold spot price.

Shortly after joining AngloGold Ashanti, Cutifani introduced a campaign called "Safety is our first value". During his tenure, the fatality rate was reduced by 50%.

Anglo American
In January 2013 it was announced that Cutifani would become the new chief executive of Anglo American plc, starting his new role on 3 April 2013, replacing Cynthia Carroll.  Since joining Anglo American, he has led a transformation of the Company.

Notable improvements per the 2019 annual results:

 Safety – 73% reduction in fatalities and 59% improvement in accident frequency rates.
 Occupational Health – 81% drop in new cases.
 Environmental Incidents - 97% drop in major incidents.
 Production – increased by 12%, whilst reducing the number of assets from 68 to 36.
 Costs – improved by 45% in real terms to return the business to a global leadership cost position.
 Mining EBITDA margin - increased by 40%.
 ROCE of 19%.
 Sustainability – announced a Sustainable Mining Plan in 2018 to significantly improve energy and water efficiency, reduce greenhouse gas emissions, and promote biodiversity.  
 In response to carbon footprint reductions, Cutifani announced a target of achieving carbon neutrality for Scope 1 and 2 emissions by 2040, with some operations achieving carbon neutrality by 2030.

Appointments and current memberships
Cutifani is the former chair and now an executive board member of the International Council on Mining and Metals. He is currently an Executive Member, having been President of South Africa’s Chamber of Mines between 2012 and 2013 (renamed as the Minerals Council South Africa). He is also a member of the International Advisory Committee for the Kellogg Innovation Network, a member of the Mining & Metals Steering Board and former Governor (now member) of the Mining and Metals Industry Programme for the  World Economic Forum. Cutifani serves on the Board of the Hydrogen Council, a global initiative of leading energy, transport and industry companies with a united vision and long-term ambition for hydrogen to foster the energy transition. Cutifani is also a member of the Advisory Board for the Vale Columbia Centre on Sustainable International Investment and an independent Director of The Power of Nutrition; a UK-based charitable foundation He is also an Independent Director of Total S.A and a member of UK Home Secretary’s Business Against Slavery Forum.

Previous memberships 
Cutifani is a former member of the following institutions:

 World Gold Council – Member of Board
 South African Chamber of Mines – Elimination of Fatalities Taskforce Leader (2013).
 Business Leadership of South Africa (BLSA) – Executive Council Member.
 Laurentian University (Canada) – Board of Governors.
 Australian Institute of Mining and Metallurgy: 
 Councillor (South Australia)
 Member of Ethics Committee
 Member of Mineral Valuation Committee
 University of Cape Town Graduate School of Business (UCT-GSB) – Member of Advisory Board.
 University of Pretoria – Member of Mining Advisory Committee.
 India-Brazil-South Africa (IBSA) Business Council Steering Committee – Member.
 Western Australian Chamber of Mines – Member of Executive Committee.
 Ontario Mining Association – Member of Executive Committee.
 Minerals Advisory Committee of Canada – Member.
 CSIRO Minerals Sector Advisory Committee (Australia)– Member.
 Foundation and Lead Industry Member for establishment of Centre for Exploration and Mining Innovation (CEMI) in Canada (Laurentian University) in 2006.

Recognition & Awards
Cutifani has won numerous academic and community awards including:

 Western Mining Corporation Awards for best student (1980).
 Bachelor of Engineering (Hons 1), University of Wollongong (1982).
 Western Mining Award for best graduating student (1982).
 Western Mining Award for best thesis in mining (1982).
 Atlas Copco Travelling Bursary for best student in Australasia (1982).
 Seco Titan Coal Industry Award for Excellence in Design (1984).
 Diggers and Dealers Digger of the Year – KCGM (1992).
 United Way Charity Drive Leader – Sudbury, Canada (2006).
 Paul Harris Fellowship Award (Rotary Group) for Services to Community, Sudbury, Canada (2006).
 Institute of People Management (IPM), South Africa – Runner up SA CEO of the Year (2011) in recognition of innovation in change management in a major listed company.
Honorary Chair – World Mining Congress, Montreal (2013).
 Engineers Australia Magazine - listed amongst the Top 100 influential engineers in Australia (2013 and 2014).
 Silver Award – Thomas Edison Global Innovation Award – Industry Collaboration (Co-Chair – Kellogg Innovation Network Development Partner Framework).
 Australia Institution of Mining and Metallurgy (AusIMM) - Institute Medal (2021)
Australia Institution of Mining and Metallurgy (AusIMM) – Fellow.
 Honorary Doctorate – Business Administration (Safety and Community Engagement), Wollongong University (2013).
 Diggers and Dealers Lifetime Achievement Award (2015).
 The Institute of Materials, Minerals and Mining (UK) – Fellow (2015).
 Engineering Council – Chartered Engineer (2015).
 Honorary Doctorate – Doctor in Laws – Laurentian University in Canada (2016).
 Royal Academy of Engineering – Fellow (2017).
 Technoserve 50th Anniversary Honouree – In honour of “extraordinary leadership in creating sustainable business solutions to end poverty around the world.” Honoured in NYC in October 2018 along with the Chairman of Coca-Cola.
 European CEO Awards – Best CEO in Sustainable Mining (2018)
 Engineers Australia – Fellowship and Chartered status in the Leadership and Management College and APEC Engineer (2019).
 South Africa Mining Industry – Inducted into the Mining Hall of Fame (2019)
 Mines and Money – CEO of the Year; Global Mining Company of the Year (2019)
AusIMM – Institute Medal (2021)
Mines and Money – Lifetime Achievement Award (2021)

Private life
Cutifani has seven children from two marriages.

References

External links
AngloGold Ashanti Homepage

1958 births
Living people
People from Wollongong
AngloGold Ashanti
Australian businesspeople
University of Wollongong alumni
De Beers people
Fellows of the Institute of Materials, Minerals and Mining